Toby Morris may refer to:
 Toby Morris (politician)
 Toby Morris (cartoonist)